The Transit Authority of Northern Kentucky (TANK) is the public transit system serving the Northern Kentucky suburbs of Cincinnati, Ohio, located in Kenton County, Boone County and Campbell County. TANK was founded in 1973 when the privately funded Greenline Bus Company ceased operation, and voters in the three counties elected to publicly fund the transit system. ATE Management, founded by Greenline's owners, provided management. ATE and its successor First Transit provided management until 2010, when TANK became self-managed.

Currently TANK operates a fleet of 100 fixed route buses and 25 demand response vehicles.

While TANK's primary service area is the three Northern Kentucky counties, all TANK routes also connect with Downtown Cincinnati where riders can transfer to vehicles operated by the Southwest Ohio Regional Transit Authority if necessary.  Although  the two systems are separate, the TANK and SORTA work to make transfers between systems easy and even sell a joint pass.

A bus redesign took effect on January 31, 2021.

Fare structure 
As of 2021, TANK charges $1.50 for all fixed route service. Students in Kindergarten through 12th grade on school days riding to and from school only have to pay $1. TANK also has passes: a 30 day pass (unlimited) for $66.
There are several regional passes offered, which are valid for unlimited rides on both TANK and Metro/Southwest Ohio Regional Transit Authority.  One Day Metro/TANK for $5; 30-day Metro/TANK for $105.

Ridership

Routes

Former routes 
1A Buttermilk Pike Express (renumbered route 17X in 1995)
1B Edgewood Express (renumbered route 18X in 1995)
1C Beechgrove Express (renumbered route 19X in 1995)
1X Houston Rd/Mineola Pike Express (discontinued on January 30, 2021; alternate service available on routes 42X and 17X)
2 Greenup (discontinued in the 1950s)
2 Kenton Hills (created in the 1950s; discontinued by 1995, when current route 2X was created)
4 Park Hills (discontinued on January 6, 2007, partially replaced by revised route 5)
4 CVG Shuttle (created March 13, 2017, discontinued August 2017, replaced by revised route 2X)
6 Rosedale (merged into Route 7 on October 28, 2000)
9 Belt Line (became part of route 17 on February 26, 1939; the next route 9 was created around the same time)
9 Taylor Mill/Independence (discontinued on January 30, 2021; replaced by revised routes 7 and 8)
10 Lewisburg (discontinued on October 16, 1964, replaced by revised route 1)
10 Visalia (ran from 1975 to January 1976)
10 Erlanger-Elsmere (created January 5, 2015, discontinued May 1, 2015)
11 Fort Thomas (discontinued January 30, 2021; partially replaced by revised route 12)
13 South Bellevue (discontinued on June 10, 1954, replaced by route 23)
14 York (discontinued July 6, 1953, replaced by route 24)
15 Southgate (discontinued in 1976, replaced by route 24)
16 Washington (discontinued on June 10, 1954, replaced by route 11; current route 16 was created later)
17 Crosstown (discontinued in 1972)
18 East Newport (discontinued in June 1963)
18X Edgewood Express (discontinued on January 30, 2021; alternate service available on routes 1, 17X, and 30X)
19 West Newport (merged into Route 20)
19X Beechgrove Express (discontinued August 12, 2017, alternate service available on Routes 1, 28X and 35X)
20 South Newport (discontinued August 12, 2017, partially replaced by revised route 16)
21 North Fort Thomas (discontinued in the 1980s, replaced by extension of former route 11)
21X Toebben Drive Express (created November 30, 2015, discontinued December 2016 or January 2017)
22 Fairfield (discontinued on July 6, 1953; current route 22 was created in 1995)
23 South Bellevue (discontinued November 1, 2014, partially replaced by revised route 12)
24 Crestview (discontinued on September 14, 2002)
24X Crestview Express (discontinued on September 14, 2002)
26 Grants Lick (discontinued on September 14, 2002)
26X Southern Campbell County Express (renamed from 26X Grants Lick Express on January 6, 2007; discontinued on August 27, 2011)
27 Moock Road Express (discontinued on October 28, 2000)
28X Empire Dr/Industrial Rd Express (discontinued on January 30, 2021; partially replaced by revised route 42X)
29X Hebron Express (split into Routes 39X and 40X on September 7, 2013)
31X Rolling Hills Dr Express (merged into route 30X on January 30, 2021)
31X Hands Pike (discontinued on September 14, 2002; number reused January 21, 2013)
33 Thomas More Pkwy/Crestview Hills (discontinued on January 30, 2021; replaced by revised route 8)
34 Walton-Burlington Connector (discontinued on August 24, 2000)
35 Florence-Crestview Connector (created on September 4, 1999; discontinued between June and October 2001; number reused August 24, 2014)
35X East-West Express (discontinued on January 30, 2021; replaced by increased frequency on routes 1 and 25)
36 Wilder (created in February, March, or April 2001; discontinued on September 14, 2002)
37X Commonwealth Houston Express (started summer 2004, discontinued on August 16, 2008, replaced by revised route 1X)
38 Uptown Hospitals
98 Burlington-Florence Connector (created early 2018, discontinued April 26, 2019)

Note that Route 8 Eastern Avenue was merged into Route 25 Alexandria on January 9, 2010; Route 25 was split on October 1, 2015 bringing this route back.

Current bus fleet 
Current as of 03/24/14

References

External links 

 

Bus transportation in Kentucky
Bus transportation in Cincinnati
Transportation in Campbell County, Kentucky
Transportation in Boone County, Kentucky
Transportation in Kenton County, Kentucky
Transit agencies in Kentucky